José Camilo Crotto (1863–1936) was an Argentine politician, founder member of the Radical Civic Union. He served as national Senator and was Governor of Buenos Aires Province between 1918 and 1921.

Early life

José Camilo was born Dolores, son of Giuseppe Crotto and Valeria Villas, belonging to a family of French-Italian roots. He received his primary education in his hometown. Later in 1873, Crotto became a pupil at San Jose school, where he completed his secondary education.

Education
Crotto obtained his law degree at the University of Buenos Aires in 1888.

Political career
José Camilo Crotto was involved in the military civic uprisings, organized by the Civic Union. In 1890, he participated in the Revolution of the Park, and 15 years later in the Revolution of 1905. Between 1909 and 1918, Crotto was president of the Unión Cívica Radical. In 1912, he was elected national senator, and on 1 May 1918 Crotto assumed the government of the province. He resigned in 1921, due to disagreements with Hipólito Yrigoyen.

References

External links

familysearch.org
familysearch.org

1863 births
1936 deaths
Argentine people of Italian descent
Argentine people of French descent
Governors of Buenos Aires Province
Members of the Argentine Senate for Buenos Aires
Lawyers from Buenos Aires
19th-century Argentine lawyers
Burials at La Recoleta Cemetery